"Scars" is a song by Danish pop and soul band Lukas Graham. It was released on 20 March 2020 by Copenhagen Records and Then We Take the World. The song was written by Gregory Hein, James Nicholas Bailey, Jimmie Gutch, Lukas Forchhammer and Morten Ristorp.

Background
In a press release, the band's lead singer Lukas Forchhammer said, "Scars come in many shapes and forms. The physical ones are often the easiest to deal with, while psychological scars can be very hard to cope with because no one can see them so we have to actively share them. We need to talk about these things in order to heal."

Credits and personnel
Credits adapted from Tidal.
 Jimmie Gutch – producer, writer
 Rissi – producer
 Aldae and Nick Bailey – co-producer
 Bart Schoudel – engineer
 Rasmus Hedegaard – engineer
 Lukas Forchhammer – gang Vocals, vocals, writer
 Morten Ristorp – gang vocals, guitar, piano, strings, vocal production, writer
 Randy Merrill – waterer
 Tony Maserati – mixer
 Gregory Hein – writer
 James Nicholas Bailey – writer

Charts

Release history

References

2020 singles
2020 songs
Lukas Graham songs
Songs written by Lukas Forchhammer
Songs written by Morten Ristorp
Copenhagen Records singles
Songs written by Gregory Hein